Integrity is the ethical concept of basing of one's actions on a consistent framework of principles.

Integrity may also refer to:

Technology
Data integrity, a concept from information and telecommunications technology in general, and cryptography in particular
System integrity, a telecommunications concept regarding the operation of a system
Integrity (operating system), a real-time operating system produced and marketed by Green Hills Software
HPE Integrity Servers, a server line from Hewlett Packard Enterprise based on the Itanium processor
Integrity by Tandem Computers, a fault-tolerant server line and Unix-based operating system whose trademark passed to HP
PTC Integrity, a software system lifecycle management and application lifecycle management platform

Arts and media

Music
Integrity (band), an American punk rock band formed in 1988
 Integrity 2000, a 1999 album by American punk band Integrity
Integrity (album), 2015 album by British grime artist Jme
 Integrity Blues, a 2016 album by American rock band Jimmy Eat World

TV and films
 Anti-Corruption (film) (translated as "Storm of Integrity"), a 1975 Hong Kong crime film
"Integrity" (Modern Family), a 2015 episode from the TV series Modern Family
 A Man of Integrity, a 2017 Iranian drama film
 Integrity (film), a 2019 Hong Kong crime film

Media companies
Integrity Media, a media communications company that publishes and distributes Christian music, films and related materials
 Integrity Records, a British independent record label

Legal
Bodily integrity, the principle of a human right to personal autonomy
Territorial integrity, a principle under international law
 Integrity Staffing Solutions, Inc. v. Busk, a 2014 US Supreme Court decision

Nautical
HMCS Integrity (1804), a cutter that disappeared in 1805 while en route from New South Wales to Chile
HMS Integrity, a name used by the Royal Navy for several ships
 Integrity (1824 ship), an English merchant ship
 MV American Integrity, an American ship built in 1978
 ARC Integrity, Vehicle Carrier	built in 1992

Other uses
 IntegrityBC, a Canadian non-profit organization focusing on political reform
 Integrity Toys, an American toy company
Integrity USA, an American non-profit organization of lesbian, gay, bisexual, and transgender Episcopalians and straight friends
 Global Integrity, a nonprofit organization based in Washington, DC which monitors governmental corruption around the world